Huangshan (Yellow Mountain, Mount Huang) is a scenic mountain range and UNESCO World Heritage Site in Anhui, China.

Huangshan may also refer to:

Huangshan City, a prefecture-level city near the Huangshan Mountains
Huangshan District, a district of Huangshan City
Huangshan Pine, a tree native to eastern China's mountains
Huangshan, a village in Shawo Township, Echeng District, Ezhou, Hubei